Serenity Rose is a comic created by Aaron Alexovich (credited as "Aaron A." until the second volume) and published by Slave Labor Graphics.  The story follows the life of Serenity Rose, as told by her through diary entries. All three volumes of Serenity Rose were published online first, starting in 2008, before being made available in print. In 2013, Alexovich started a Kickstarter to publish all volumes in a complete set, which reached full funding in November 2013. The comics in full are still available online.

Story 
Serenity Rose is the story of a young witch named Serenity Rose, also known as Sera. In the lore of the comic, Sera is one of five existing American witches and one of fifty-seven throughout the world. Sera describes the powers of witches in her world, including flight, producing ectoplasmic beings, changing form. The comic follows Sera as a young adult, attempting to find peace in the town of Crestfallen, a town filled with oddities and bizarre creatures, whose residents are drawn to her abilities. Book One, "Working Through the Negativity" begins with Sera explaining her therapist told her to keep her thoughts in a diary, but she thinks diaries are stupid, so she decided to make a comic book instead. The first book introduces most of the main characters, including Sera's family, best friends Contessa and Kelton, and her idol, Vicious Whisper. It also delves into her past, repeatedly addressing a traumatic incident in which Sera totaled a bus with her powers in a nervous breakdown. While trying to avoid the company of others, Sera writes a comic called "Welcome to Statickland" which she publishes under a pseudonym (though most seem to know it is her). While attending a club in Crestfallen, Sera witnesses clubgoers acting paranormally and responds, causing the destruction of the club. "Working Through the Negativity" ends with Serenity meeting Vicious Whisper, a British witch and performer as well as Sera's idol. Vicious offers to teach her how to use her powers, and Serenity accepts.

The second series, "Goodbye, Crestfallen!" begins where the last left off, with Sera experiencing strange dreams and believing she is producing ectoplasm in her sleep. She finds out a witch called Stiletta has been stealing her dreams and using them to conjure monstrosities. One attacks the city of Crestfallen and seriously injures her friend Contessa. Later she is confronted by Stiletta and her controller, a witch called Valentine, who tells Sera Stiletta had been raised in a mine by her grandmother, completely locked away from society, and was behind the events at the club that Sera destroyed. In Stiletta's attempt to kill Sera, Kelton and Contessa intercede, until Sera finds the will to fight and takes Stiletta to the cave where her dream ectoplasm is held. In the end Stiletta takes her own life, and the mysterious witch who brought her to Sera explains that there are always fifty-seven witches on earth, so the next child born will be a witch to take Stiletta's place. Sera tells him to leave Crestfallen. To accommodate her, Vicious floats her home to Crestfallen so she can train Sera there. The art style in the second volume is noticeably different from the first, giving character more realistic proportions and using a sharper black and white style than the first.

The third volume, "Break Your Stupid Heart" opens at a Vicious Whisper concert in Crestfallen, where Sera participated and Vicious used some of her creations from the previous volume in the show. It is the most optimistic opening in the series. While in town, Vicious opens a new restaurant based on a "water pagoda" created by a witch long passed. After an argument with Contessa, she reveals to Serenity that many magical elements have "unlocked" in Crestfallen and magical creatures in the town are behaving differently. Serenity is met with a childhood friend, Madeline Price. It's discovered that Serenity's nervous break down which caused her to destroy a schoolbus was caused by Madeline yelling at her for not protecting her from bullies. Madeline's family left Crestfallen afterwards, and she describes her life traveling the world and meeting other witches in her reunion with Sera, and how her hand was seriously injured when a bomb exploded in a witch temple, called a Califia. They explored some of the witch-made architecture in Crestfallen, including areas they are not allowed into, including the cave which contains Sera's dream ectoplasm. Madeline reveals that Sera had dreamed up an ectoplasm version of her, that had existed since they were in school together. Madeline followed the ectoplasm copy to the cave, and would come there regularly. The two have an intimate moment until Sera finds out Madeline had been photographing Sera's creations, to benefit a teacher who was injured in the Califia, but was not aided by any of the witches there. This explains Madeline's general distrust of witches aside from Serenity. Sera decides she owes her, and allows her to take the pictures. Trying to tell V what happened, Sera finds out V had hired her assistant, Crawlsie, specifically to try and play matchmaker with the two of them, but before she has a breakdown, Crawlsie convinced her it's not worth staying angry about, and Sera asks her on a date.

Vicious Whispers 

"Vicious Whispers" was a side comic conceived by Aaron A. where Vicious Whisper would offer advice to reader mail in the form of a regular web comic. The comics were done in two sets, one in 2006, consisting of 22 total comics, and another in 2010, consisting of 27 comics. The comics are done in character, but do not canonically effect or have much to do with the main story.

Characters

Serenity Rose 
Serenity "Sera" Rose is one of five American witches and the most famous of them. She is very reclusive and shy and despises the attention toward herself. She (like Alexovich) is originally from Chicago. When she was four, her mother died from a mysterious illness. Heartbroken Sera froze part of Lake Michigan in the middle of July, which didn't make the locals too happy. About a month later, Sera's father receives an offer to move to a town in the Pacific Northwest called Crestfallen.  The Mayor of Crestfallen offered to give the Roses a large home gratis. Mr. Rose probably didn't realize that he and his daughter had moved to "The Spookiest Lil' Town in America" which Sera later called a "prison zoo" because the mayor had turned the town into sort of a Horror Disneyland over time. Despite the many offers for Serenity to be an apprentice to other witches, Mr. Rose did not allow it. However Sera didn't mind and was pretty proud that her father had stuck up for her well-being. At fifteen, a witch named Valentine was the latest visitor to attempt to coerce the young witch to leave Crestfallen. Upon her father's advice, Sera rejected this offer too.

A year later, Sera's father was killed in a car accident while trying to avoid crashing into a goblin. Shortly, after his death, The Bus Incident occurred which propelled Sera into national infamy. Accused of hijacking the bus that she was on, the teenage girl was ordered to serve nothing more than counseling with a court-appointed psychologist because she was a witch and that the hijacking may have been caused due to the stress of losing her father. The details of the bus incident are unclear as Sera has blocked those events from her memory. Sera is not even sure that she caused the incident though she accepted the responsibility.

Sera generally dresses in gothic attire, but her make-up and blue hair are both put in place by shapeshifting. To her disgust, She is idolized by Crestfallen and refuses every year any invitation to have her join the Halloween parade.  Sera has problems with her identity as a witch, her future, and is unsure of her sexuality (and is quite embarrassed by it).

Contessa Rubikov 
Contessa "Tess" Rubikov is Serenity Rose's best friend/enemy. They've known each other since Sera first arrived in Crestfallen, and Contessa was the first person to actually treat Sera like a human being, which sparked a friendship. Contessa is six feet tall and has dyed red hair (real hair color is unknown) and thick eyebrows, three tattoos and six piercings. The most noticeable tattoo is that of a happy sun on her shoulder. She has two earrings on each ear and a nose stud; the sixth piercing is a hole she has in her head due to a screwdriver-related "accident". She lives with Grandpa Rubikov (real first name unknown). Sera and Tess seem to have an odd like/dislike relationship.

She enjoys anything related to violence and taunting (and claims to be the town's resident annoyance). She especially likes taunting Tiphané, a goth vampire wannabe. She once stole holy water from St. Tedius to use as fuel for her holy water cannon, which was used—ineffectively—against a real vampire. She had also once made Sera sit through the local Halloween parade, until a large goblin parade-float came to her home after she heavily denied several goblins candy (and she fought back as a large ectoplasm bunny). Tess is also quite hyperactive and silly, and is not a fan of 'spooky-cute' stuff, almost the complete opposite of her best friend. Tess is Sera's only means of vehicle transportation, since Tess has a driver's license. Her car has flames painted on it.

Vicious Whisper 
Vicious Whisper is described as a Japa-Brit (half Japanese half British) witch and singer whose real name is Victoria Whisper but her friends call her V.  Her songs have strong anti-business sentiments attached to them (i.e. "Napalm on Wall Street"; these songs seem quite the opposite of her personality) and she normally floats around a stadium with her on tour. Tutored by Ms. Thorpp, another famous English witch, V has had a chance to fully explore what it is like to be a witch and uses her abilities to their full potential. She has met every known witch in the world, including supposedly mythological ones such as Baba Yaga.  When she is not on tour she sits and thinks at her secluded home on ectoplasm clouds while drinking peppermint tea. Her hair is a hot pink and almost always up in pigtails. She is the only witch Sera has met, and they gain a master-apprentice relationship by the end of the series.

She is very kind and quite intelligent, and is often referred to as a perkigoff. V has many philosophies and opinions on life, and hates little. She also has little desire for materialistic things. She also stars in her own webcomic/advice column Vicious Whispers when Alexovich is busy working on other projects.

Dewey Dwayne Kelton
Dewey Dwayne Kelton, or Kelton as he is referred to throughout most of the story, is a reluctant bassist for a pop punk garage band and publisher for a college zine. Kelton is one of Sera's closer friends, as well as the publisher of her anonymous comics where she uses the alias of Zero when submitting her work. Often viewed as a "worry-wart" by his acquaintances, Kelton is cautious and not very aggressive.

He often comes to Sera's side when she needs it most as a shoulder to cry on and as the worried friend. First introduced in "Working Through the Negativity", Kelton has consistently been the comforting guy friend to Sera all the way through the comic's history. Sera and Kelton's relationship remains platonic. When Sera and Tess are not getting along, Kelton is usually there to act as a quiet mediator.

Stiletta
Not much was known about Stiletta until the end of Goodbye Crestfallen except that she was quite aggressive and almost heartless. She can be easily distinguished by the scars/stitches on her body and the neon yellow hair that covers her right eye which is missing. It is also unclear if Stilletta is her real name as she has gone by various alias such as "The Blonde Witch" or "The Tongue Witch". Stiletta is believed to have given "the Curse" to the singer of a band, which caused the vampire incident in the Darkroom, and attacked Sera in a public bathroom at one point.

It was speculated that Stiletta was in the employ of Skarsdayle to somehow persuade Serenity into joining Rivet Hed because Skarsdayle's assistant (referred to as "Chester" when Serenity visits Rivet Hed) bore a resemblance to Stiletta, and shape shifting may be responsible for the differences.  However, in Goodbye Crestfallen, Stiletta was actually Valentine's apprentice. Supposedly, her parents, Theo and Christianne Van Vedeker wanted her to be killed fearing that news that having a witch for a daughter would ruin their company.  But her grandmother Willemina Van Vedeker and the reclusive matriarch of the Van Vedeker empire had different plans.

Willemina would hide Stiletta in an abandoned diamond mine in Zimbabwe along with about 8 years of supplies including five children's books, fuel, and cutlery.  What happened next could probably be implied. Willemina was possibly killed then left in the cave with Stiletta, thus allowing Theo and Christianne to inherit his mother's fortune.  Her presumed death occurred about 17 years before Goodbye Crestfallen. However, Theo and Christianne would not get away with their crimes of greed and abandonment as three years prior to Goodbye Crestfallen they would be found murdered, possibly by Stiletta.

Six weeks prior to Goodbye Crestfallen, SSI investigators discovered the mine along with many spellcast creatures that Stiletta may have produced. It was revealed at the end of Goodbye Crestfallen that Stiletta was the twin sister of the diamond heiress Simon Van Vedeker who looks very much like her.

Madeline Price
Madeline Price was the girl on the bus that may have triggered the legendary event simply known as "The Bus Incident".  The Bus Incident in Serenity Rose has been the MacGuffin element throughout the story especially since Sera has blocked out the majority of the incident from her mind.  But what Sera does know is that Maddy was there. Maddy had been taunted and bullied for her sexuality and the students at her high school were far from accepting of her difference, even more so than having a witch go to high school with them.  The majority of bullying came from the boys who would call her "Mad Dog" and "dyke" and throw beer cans at her. But what set her off was when Sera gave Maddy a note explaining how Sera appreciated her.  Maddy took the letter the wrong way and thought that Sera gave her the letter to be mean. By that time, Maddy got off the bus and The Bus Incident occurred.

Crawlsie
Crawlsie is the bubbly assistant to Vicious Whisper who was hired shortly after Vicious agreed to mentor Serenity. Crawlsie is a fan of the supernatural, though not a witch herself, and has several tattoos, including one dedicated to Serenity. Originally, her and Sera discover that Vicious had hired Crawlsie specifically to play matchmaker with the two of them. In the end, Sera and Crawlsie go on a date, but leave Vicious a message that it was done on their own accord, and she it's "not all hers".

Valentine 
Valentine goes by many aliases. Evil is probably one of them.  His face is not well defined as it is always covered by shadow.  His face, however, does have one distinguishing feature: violet swirling tattoos around his eyes.  In the first volume of Serenity Rose, Valentine's name is mentioned when Sera underlines a newspaper report discussing the SSI possibly identifying him as an "unidentified Slavic warlock". When Sera was 15, Valentine approached Sera and asked her to be his apprentice, Sera's father advised her to say no, which did not please Valentine.

Zoe and Mary Ann Mirolette 
Sera's family is composed of Zoe Mirolette, her stepmother, and Mary Ann, her eight-year-old half-sister. Zoe Mirolette is Sera's stepmother.  A few years after moving to Crestfallen, Mr. Rose remarried and had a second child (Mary Ann). Zoe is described as British, and is the proprietor of the Mended Wing Inn in Crestfallen. Mary Ann Mirolette is Sera's half-sister. Mary Ann, like most younger siblings, looks up to her big half-sister.  She is also not afraid to ask Sera for help.  Mary Ann is the few characters that has been seen outside of printed media as she played a supporting role in Aaron Alexovich's short animation "Good Guys Wear Black" starring Serenity Rose.

Supernatural Shield Initiative 
A special taskforce called the Supernatural Shield Initiative (SSI) was formed in 1933 to handle supernatural creatures and people. Human rights groups, as well as witches, have criticized their methods. Merrick used the word "priests" to describe members of the SSI.

Some members of the SSI include:
 Lois McCreedy (retired, now Sheriff of Crestfallen Police Department)
 Chester Merrick (investigator)
 Victor Vogel (former Captain, discharged. Now news commentator.)
 Barney the Purple Dinosaur (Current Chief of Bureau of Investigations. Former host of an obscene reality show.)

Magic creatures

Witches
Witches are rare genetic accidents of nature. They are people born with the ability to float and control energy and matter, even capable of shape-shifting. They can heal themselves or others if they are injured and fix complicated objects without any knowledge of their inner-workings. They can create ectoplasm, a malleable goo, that they use essentially to create whatever comes to their mind at the time.

The Church of Right Thinking is opposed to witches, believing them to be evil. Members of secular society such as Chuck St. Hardwell of "Bare Knuckles" argue that witches are dangerous and may not even be considered human.

Some witches include:
 Serenity Rose (USA; university student, amateur painter and known recluse)
 Vicious Whisper a.k.a. Victoria Whisper (UK; rock star)
 Rivet Hed a.k.a. Marvin Garden (USA; performer)
 Atlan Samuel (American, longtime agent of the United States government)
 Emily Ash (American; hardcore Christian homemaker; has never used her powers)
 Michael Fulmouth (American; went on a killing spree in the 50s; currently in a coma after being shot in the head)
 Dame Glaurie Thorpp (UK; children's books author and former tutor of Vicious Whisper)
 Baba Yaga (Russian)
 Valentine (Slavic)
 Stiletta (Unknown)
 Dr. Fillipp Kibalchenko (Russian; political dissident and defector; currently in a self-induced coma after making an oath to not move until all nuclear energy is gone from the world)

According to Valentine, there are always exactly 57 witches. When one dies, the very next child born will be a witch.

Vampires
Blood-sucking creatures whose origins are left to speculation. One rumor is that vampires were created by the Order of Silver—a breakaway sect from the Knights of Templar—and a Slavic warlock in the 13th century. Their intent was to create a plague that only they, with their sacred armaments, could cure. Thus, they would gain fame and power as the only hope against such an epidemic. The idea backfired, and vampires persist today. Vampires have great strength and agility and heal quickly of any wounds not inflicted by silver or flame. They can be hurt by blessed objects and are sensitive to sunlight. When deprived of blood they are reduced to a primal state, trembling with a need known to only the most pathological of drug addicts. The diluted blood of vampires- mixed with that of humans- is used to create a powerful drug called "The Curse" in order to recreate the orgasmic feel of bloodlust. Some countries in Central and South America keep vampires captive in order to produce Curse, as it sells for a high price on the black market.  Undiluted Curse can turn the user into a full-blown blood-lusting monster.

Goblins
Small creatures native to Crestfallen and two other towns. They usually cluster around trolls or tourists and beg for food. They were brought to Crestfallen by the founding coven of witches to act as jesters and messengers. They appear to have no lower lip and large teeth.

Ogres
Large, dim-witted giants that were once used to move heavy stones to aid in building. Now they sit and stare, not having much use, and Crestfallen's children enjoy climbing on them.

Trolls
Aggressive creatures that guard the forest around Crestfallen and supposedly only attack non-witches. They have big hairy bodies and a mask-like face.

Spellcast
Spellcast are the name used to describe the ectoplasmic creatures created by witches. Some spellcast are sentient. Most are created to obey orders.  However, in rare cases, they are produced by witches without them even knowing it in their sleep or by collecting residual traces of ectoplasm.

Future Issues

Following the Kickstarter, Aaron Alexovich stated in an interview that he's working on "Heartshaped Skull 2.0" though he did not release any details on the project nor a timeframe.

Awards and recognition

In 2014, the Kickstarter collection of the three original volumes was nominated for a Ghastly Award for Best Archival Collection.

List of Published Volumes

External links
heartshapedskull.com, Aaron Alexovich's website, including the "Goodbye Crestfallen" webcomic.
"Good Guys Wear Black", created prior to the comic by Alexovich, as a student film.
Sequential Tart review (February 2004)

References

2002 webcomic debuts
American webcomics
Fictional witches
Slave Labor Graphics titles